The I Am JoJo Tour was the third headlining & first world concert tour by American singer-songwriter JoJo. It was launched in support of her upcoming yet to be titled third studio album & its III., which included the album's first 3 singles. The first leg of the "I Am JoJo" tour was announced on October 5, 2015 and the first dates were revealed the same day. It kicked off on November 2, 2015 in Minneapolis. The tour traveled to theaters and clubs across the country, with stops in New York, Chicago, St. Louis, Los Angeles, Atlanta, Houston, and Toronto before wrapping the first leg in the U.S. on December 20, 2015 in New Orleans. The first leg of the tour will visit just 24 cities and is currently being expanded to more cities in the US and to Canada. Its first set of international European dates were announced on December 15, 2015 bringing a total of 31 shows so far; more international dates are yet to be announced. Preparations for the shows began a month prior to the beginning of the tour. After being away for so long JoJo wanted the tour to be more intimate and be "all about connecting".

The set list for the concerts included songs from JoJo's first two studio albums, her two mixtapes as well as few covers of other artists. The central theme of the tour was to take audiences down memory lane by performing her repertoire in chronological order beginning with her 2004 self titled debut album and everything else in between right up until her most current release of the III. Majority of the shows included VIP meet & greet packages that all took place before the show which included a private acoustic performance from JoJo, where she would perform a few rehearsed songs for the crowd as well as snippets of requested songs from the crowd which included most of the leaked songs that surfaced online throughout 2009 until 2014.

Background
In an interview with Billboard.com at the 2015 MTV Video Music Awards on August 30, 2015, JoJo expressed plans to go on a nationwide tour before heading overseas in 2016 for further promotion. On October 5, 2015 JoJo announced her second major nationwide tour entitled The "I Am JoJo Tour" via her official Twitter page. The tour will visit 23 cities all across North America beginning on November 2 at Minneapolis’ Triple Rock Social Club and runs through the end of the year, wrapping up on JoJo's 25th Birthday on December 20 at the Hi Ho Lounge in New Orleans., making it her widest spread tour to date. The tour will visit smaller more intimate venues such as theaters & nightclubs as a way to reconnect with fans after so long. During an interview with AXS JoJo discussed what plans she had for the tour stating "For this tour, I wanted to take a journey back to the beginning, back to my first album where ‘Leave (Get Out)’ came from. I wanted to visit the second album, The High Road, which had 'Too Little Too Late.' And, I wanted to cover the mixtapes that I released while I was in that period of limbo. I'll be doing everything, right up to the tringle and I'll even do a couple of new songs that will be on the upcoming album". On October 26, 2015 JoJo officially announced that Aaron Camper would be serving as the opening act for the duration of the tour beginning on November 3, 2015 show. On December 14, 2015 JoJo announced the first international tour date for the show in Paris, France, on March 5, 2016. Tickets officially went on sale that same week on December 16, 2015. The next day an additional European date had been announced at the O2 Academy in Islington, London on March 7, 2016. Tickets go on sale December 17, 2015.

Commercial response
Pre-Sale & VIP Tickets for the "I Am JoJo Tour" went on sale Wednesday October 7, 2015 with General Public tickets going on sale on Friday October 9, 2015. 2 hours after tickets went on sale The December 12 date in Washington, DC sold out, followed by New York (Nov. 3), Los Angeles (Nov. 23), San Francisco (Nov. 24), Seattle (Nov. 29) & Toronto (Dec. 15) all within its first day on sale. In response to the reaction to the tour JoJo stated "I am vibrating with excitement and thankfulness. After such a long journey, this kind of response surprises the hell out of me and makes me feel like the luckiest girl in the world. Which I am. To have you. THANK YOU THANK YOU". Due to the high demand of sales, On October 23, 2015 more VIP packages were made available for an additional 10 cities, which include tour perks & Meet & Greet packages. VIP packages for the tour included 1 Show Ticket, Access to a VIP Meet & Greet with JoJo, Access to an Acoustic Song Performed by JoJo, A Limited Edition Poster & An Exclusive VIP Laminate.

Opening act
 Aaron Camper

Set list

{{hidden
| headercss = background: #ccccff; font-size: 100%; width: 65%;
| contentcss = text-align: left; font-size: 100%; width: 75%;
| header = Europe Setlist
| content =
This set list is representative of the performance in Germany on March 3, 2016. It does not represent all concerts for the duration of the tour.

"Baby, It's You"
"Breezy" / "City Lights" / "The Happy Song" 
"Leave (Get Out)"
"Anything"
"Good Ol'"
"Too Little Too Late"
"Boy Without A Heart"
"Marvins Room (Can't Do Better)" 
"Demonstrate"
"PILLOWTALK" 
"Take Me Home" 
"Good Thing"
"When Love Hurts"
"You Make Me Feel (Mighty Real)" 
"Save My Soul"
"Say Love"
Encore
"I Am"
}}

{{hidden
| headercss = background: #ccccff; font-size: 100%; width: 65%;
| contentcss = text-align: left; font-size: 100%; width: 75%;
| header = North America Setlist
| content =
This set list is representative of the performance in Minneapolis on November 2, 2015. It does not represent all concerts for the duration of the tour.

"Baby, It's You"
"Breezy" / "City Lights" / "The Happy Song" 
"Leave (Get Out)"
"Anything"
"Good Ol'"
"Like That"
"Too Little Too Late"
"Thinking Out Loud"
"Marvins Room (Can't Do Better)" 
"Demonstrate"
"Better With Love
"Planes" 
"Take Me Home" 
"When Love Hurts"
"You Make Me Feel (Mighty Real)" 
"Save My Soul"
"Say Love"
Encore
"I Am"
}}

Tour dates

Notes

References

External links
 Official Website

2015 concert tours
2016 concert tours